Starshel ("hornet") is a satirical magazine published in the Bulgaria. Founded in 1886 and published without interruption since 1946, it is the oldest Bulgarian periodical in continuous circulation. The magazines is based in Sofia and is published on a weekly basis.

References

External links
  

1886 establishments in Bulgaria
Magazines published in Bulgaria
Bulgarian-language magazines
Satirical magazines published in Europe
Humor magazines
Magazines established in 1886
Mass media in Sofia
Weekly magazines